The Kadavul Hindu Temple is a Jaffna-Style Hindu temple dedicated to the Shiva located on the Kauai island in the state of Hawaii, USA. It is maintained by the Saiva Siddhanta Temple which is also known as Kauai Aadheenam or Kauai's Hindu Monastery.

Description 

Kadavul is an ancient Tamil word for God, meaning “He who is both immanent and transcendent.” Kadavul Temple was established in 1973 by Sivaya Subramuniyaswami. It is one of two temples in Kauai Aadheenam. Other temple is Iraivan Temple. It houses 39-inch-tall Crystal Sivalingam that will one day be the central icon in Iraivan Temple. It's Crystal Sivalingam is believed to be the largest six-sided, single-pointed crystal ever found. In future Crystal Sivalingam will housed in the Iraivan Temple.  Kadavul Temple is located next to the Wailua River and 8 km from Mount Waialeale. Crystal Sivalingam is a 320 kg, 39-inch-tall, uncut quartz crystal, believed to be the largest six-sided, single-pointed crystal ever found.

Gallery

See also 
 Sivaya Subramuniyaswami
 Bodhinatha Veylanswami
 Iraivan Temple
 Saiva Siddhanta Church

References

Hindu temples in Hawaii
Asian-American culture in Hawaii
Buildings and structures in Kauai County, Hawaii
Shiva temples
1973 establishments in Hawaii
Indian-American culture in Hawaii
Hinduism in the United States